Edlir Tetova (born 14 April 1983) is an Albanian professional football coach and former player, who is the current head coach of Egnatia in the Kategoria Superiore.

Tetova most recently played for Teuta, Elbasani in the Kategoria Superiore. His natural position is left midfielder but he can also play as a left back when needed.

Club career
He has spent most of his career in the Kategoria Superiore with Teuta, Elbasani and Besa.

References

External links
 Profile - FSHF

1983 births
Living people
Footballers from Durrës
Albanian footballers
Association football midfielders
KF Teuta Durrës players
KF Elbasani players
Besa Kavajë players
FC Kamza players
FK Partizani Tirana players
Kategoria Superiore players
Kategoria e Parë players
Albanian football managers
Albania youth international footballers
Albania under-21 international footballers